Albert John Francis Lewis (1921-2008) was a Welsh Anglican priest in the late twentieth century: he was the Archdeacon of Margam from 1981 to 1988; and Archdeacon of Llandaff from 1988 to 1991.

He was educated at the University College of South Wales and St. Michael's College, Llandaff; and ordained in 1945. After a curacy in Cardiff he was the incumbent at Pendoylan until his appointment as Archdeacon.

References

1921 births
2008 deaths
Alumni of Cardiff University
Archdeacons of Margam
Archdeacons of Llandaff